
Gmina Świętajno is a rural gmina (administrative district) in Szczytno County, Warmian-Masurian Voivodeship, in northern Poland.

The gmina contains part of the protected area called Masurian Landscape Park.

Villages
Gmina Świętajno contains the villages and settlements of Biały Grunt, Brzózki, Bystrz, Chajdyce, Chochół, Cis, Długi Borek, Jerominy, Jerutki, Jeruty, Kierwik, Koczek, Kolonia, Konrady, Łąck Mały, Łąck Wielki, Myszadło, Niedźwiedzica, Nowe Czajki, Piasutno, Połom, Powałczyn, Racibórz, Spychówko, Spychowo, Spychowski Piec, Stare Czajki, Świętajno, Szklarnia and Zielone.

Neighbouring gminas
Gmina Świętajno is bordered by the gminas of Dźwierzuty, Piecki, Rozogi, Ruciane-Nida and Szczytno.

References
Polish official population figures 2006

Swietajno
Szczytno County